St Marys Street may refer to:
 The St. Mary's Strip in San Antonio, Texas, U.S.
 St. Mary's Street station, in Massachusetts, U.S.
Boston University Central station, formerly known as St. Mary's Street
 St Mary's Street, Cambridge
 St. Mary's Street, Cardiff
 St Mary's Street, Edinburgh, formerly known as Leith Wynd, the original main route from Edinburgh to the Port of Leith

Odonyms referring to religion